Major General B. N. Kumar was an Indian Army Officer. He was chairman of Bhakra  Beas Management Board (BBMB).  He was shot dead by militants in Chandigarh in 1988.

References

1988 deaths
1988 murders in Asia
Indian generals
Victims of the insurgency in Punjab
Assassinated Indian people
Assassinated military personnel
People murdered in Chandigarh
Year of birth missing
Victims of Sikh terrorism
Indian military personnel killed in action
Deaths by firearm in India